Philip Cave Kingsford (10 August 1891 – 26 July 1919) was a British track and field athlete who competed at the 1912 Summer Olympics. He finished 15th in the long jump and 19th in the standing long jump event.

In 1914 Kingsford won the Amateur Athletic Association of England long jump title and finished fourth in the triple jump. He served with the Middlesex Regiment in India.

References

1891 births
1919 deaths
British male long jumpers
Olympic athletes of Great Britain
Athletes (track and field) at the 1912 Summer Olympics